Reid Travis (born November 25, 1995) is an American professional basketball player for Shimane Susanoo Magic of the B.League. He played college basketball for the Kentucky Wildcats. He began his college career with the Stanford Cardinal, where he was a two-time first-team all-conference selection in the Pac-12.

High school career

During Reid's senior year, he led the Islanders to their third straight state title while averaging 26.1 points and 9 rebounds. He participated in the 2014 McDonald's All-American Game playing 14 minutes scoring 8 points with 5 rebounds helping the West win over the East 105–102.

Travis was ranked in the top 50 in nation's recruits in 2014. He was considering Minnesota, Duke, and Michigan State before choosing Stanford.

He also played football his first three years in high school before focusing on basketball his senior year.

College career
In Travis's freshman year, he played in 28 games and started in 12 of them. He averaged 6.2 points and 5.6 rebounds.

In his sophomore year, Travis started the first 8 games for the Cardinal at power forward, but suffered a season-ending stress fracture in his left leg prior to a game against Texas on December 19th. He averaged 12.8 points and 7.1 rebounds in his abbreviated season. He applied for and was granted a medical redshirt in February.

In his third year, as a redshirt-sophomore, Travis started all 27 games; averaging 17.4 points and a career high 8.9 rebounds per game. At the end of the year, he was selected by Pac-12 coaches for the All-Pac-12 first team.

His fourth year, he started all 35 games; averaging 19.5 points and averaging 8.7 rebounds while shooting only .295% (18–61) from behind the arc. Travis received First team All-Pac-12 honors for the second straight year. He was also named First Team All-District 20 by the NABC and the District IX All-District Team by the USBWA. On December 17, he recorded his 1,000th point for the Cardinal against San Francisco where he scored 29 points, 8 rebounds, and shot 11–18 from the field. He was named Pac 12 player of the week on February 6 after scoring 33 points, including 23 in the first half, along with nine rebounds to lead Stanford to a 94–78 win over Washington.

Travis declared for the 2018 NBA draft, but did not sign with an agent; opting instead to return for his redshirt-senior year. On May 30, he announced he was withdrawing from the draft but transferring from Stanford. On June 20, 2018, Travis announced that he would transfer to and play for the University of Kentucky. In his only season at Kentucky, Travis averaged 11.2 points and 7.2 rebounds per game.

Professional career
After going undrafted in the 2019 NBA draft, Travis joined the Atlanta Hawks for the 2019 NBA Summer League.

On July 22, 2019, Travis signed his first professional contract with Medi Bayreuth of the Basketball Bundesliga. He averaged 9.8 points and 5.4 rebounds per game when the season was suspended.

Travis signed with Shimane Susanoo Magic of the B.League on June 29, 2020.

Career statistics

College

|-
| style="text-align:left;"| 2014–15
| style="text-align:left;"| Stanford
| 28 || 12 || 23.1 || .489 || – || .459 || 5.6 || .4 || .9 || .3 || 6.2
|-
| style="text-align:left;"| 2015–16
| style="text-align:left;"| Stanford
| 8 || 8 || 32.8 || .557 || – || .480 || 7.1 || .8 || .8 || .6 || 12.8
|-
| style="text-align:left;"| 2016–17
| style="text-align:left;"| Stanford
| 27 || 27 || 30.1 || .579 || .000 || .652 || 8.9 || .5 || .5 || .2 || 17.4
|-
| style="text-align:left;"| 2017–18
| style="text-align:left;"| Stanford
| 35 || 35 || 34.0 || .527 || .295 || .675 || 8.7 || 1.3 || .7 || .1 || 19.5
|-
| style="text-align:left;"| 2018–19
| style="text-align:left;"| Kentucky
| 32 || 28 || 28.6 || .537 || .269 || .732 || 7.2 || .9 || .4 || .7 || 11.2
|- class="sortbottom"
| style="text-align:center;" colspan="2"| Career
| 130 || 110 || 29.4 || .539 || .284 || .641 || 7.6 || .8 || .6 || .3 || 13.7

Personal life
Travis was born in Minneapolis and has two brothers and two sisters. His brother, Jonah, played basketball at Harvard from 2011–15 and his cousin, Ross, played basketball at Penn State and is now a tight end in the NFL for the Arizona Cardinals.

References

External links
 Stanford Cardinal Bio
 

1995 births
Living people
American expatriate basketball people in Germany
American men's basketball players
Basketball players from Minneapolis
Kentucky Wildcats men's basketball players
McDonald's High School All-Americans
Medi Bayreuth players
Power forwards (basketball)
Stanford Cardinal men's basketball players
DeLaSalle High School (Minneapolis) alumni